Gallupville Evangelical Lutheran Church is a historic Evangelical Lutheran church on 980 NY 443 in Gallupville, Schoharie County, New York.  It is a rectangular, gable roofed, timber framed structure with narrow clapboard siding in the vernacular Greek Revival style.  It was built in 1853 and a two bay, gable roofed Sunday School parish wing was added about 1964.  A large two floor parish hall was added about 2002 that includes classrooms, offices, youth room, nursery, library, food pantry and storage areas.

When the church was founded it belonged to the Augustana Synod and later was a congregation of the Lutheran Church in America (LCA). Later the LCA and several other Lutheran synods joined together to form the Evangelical Lutheran Church in America (ELCA).  In 2010, Evangelical left the ELCA to become a charter congregation of the newly formed North American Lutheran Church.

It was listed on the National Register of Historic Places in 2002.

References

Lutheran churches in New York (state)
Churches on the National Register of Historic Places in New York (state)
Churches completed in 1853
19th-century Lutheran churches in the United States
Churches in Schoharie County, New York
National Register of Historic Places in Schoharie County, New York
North American Lutheran Church